Manuel Varela (1892–1927) was a Uruguayan footballer. He played in twelve matches for the Uruguay national football team from 1914 to 1919. He was also part of Uruguay's squad for the 1916 South American Championship.

References

External links
 

1892 births
1927 deaths
Uruguayan footballers
Uruguay international footballers
Place of birth missing
Association football defenders
Peñarol players
Club Nacional de Football players